Hippotherium is an extinct genus of horse that lived in during the Miocene through Pliocene ~13.65—3.3 Mya, existing for .

Species 

 

The type species, H. primigenius, is known from Miocene deposits in Europe and the Middle East, while the species H. koenigswaldi and H. catalaunicum have been found in Miocene deposits in Spain. The Asian hipparionin "Hipparion" weihoense from early Late Miocene deposits in northern China has also been referred to the genus.

Fossil distribution
Doue-la-Fontaine France estimated age:  ~13.65—7.25 Mya.
Lower Bakhtiari Formation, northern Iraq, estimated age: ~11.6—9.0 Mya.
Kurtchuk-Tchekmedje, Turkey estimated age: ~11.61—5.33 Mya.

References 

Miocene horses
Neogene mammals of Europe
Neogene mammals of Africa
Neogene mammals of Asia
Miocene odd-toed ungulates
Pliocene horses
Pliocene extinctions
Prehistoric placental genera
Miocene genus first appearances
Fossil taxa described in 1832